John Leake Newbold Stratton (November 27, 1817, Mount Holly Township, New Jersey – May 17, 1889, Mount Holly Township, New Jersey) was an American Republican Party politician who represented New Jersey's 2nd congressional district for two terms from 1859 to 1863.

Early life and career
Middleton was born in Mount Holly Township, New Jersey on November 27, 1817. He attended private schools at Mount Holly, prepared for college at Mendham, and graduated from Princeton College in 1836. He was a lawyer in private practice.

Congress
Stratton was elected as a Republican to the Thirty-sixth and Thirty-seventh Congresses, serving in office from March 4, 1859 to March 3, 1863, but was not a candidate for renomination in 1862 to the Thirty-eighth.

Later career and death
He was a delegate to the Union National Convention of Conservatives at Philadelphia in 1866, and was president of the Farmers’ National Bank of Mount Holly in 1875. He died on May 17, 1889 in Mount Holly, and was interred there in St. Andrews Cemetery.

External links

John Leake Newbold Stratton at The Political Graveyard

1817 births
1889 deaths
New Jersey lawyers
People from Mount Holly, New Jersey
Princeton University alumni
Republican Party members of the United States House of Representatives from New Jersey
19th-century American politicians
19th-century American lawyers